Bob Strachan (born 8 June 1944) is a former Australian rules footballer who played for  in the Victorian Football League (VFL). Strachan played seven matches in the VFL for South Melbourne between 1963 and 1965. After retiring he became a tennis umpire.

References

1944 births
Sydney Swans players
Horsham Football Club players
Australian rules footballers from Victoria (Australia)
Tennis umpires
Living people